Klippenstein is a surname. Notable people with the surname include:

 Dan Klippenstein (1939–1997), Canadian curler
 Glen Klippenstein (born 1937), American politician
 Ken Klippenstein (born 1988), American journalist

Russian Mennonite surnames